You Are the One or You're the One may refer to:

Film and television
 If You Are the One (game show), a Chinese dating reality show
 You Are the One (Andy Warhol), a lost music video made by Andy Warhol in 1986
 You Are the One (film), a 2006 Filipino romantic comedy
 You Are the One (Singaporean TV series), a 2005 Singapore Chinese drama series
 You Are the One (Argentine TV series) (Sos mi vida), a 2006 Argentine romantic comedy TV series
 You're the One (2000 film) (Una historia de entonces), a Spanish film directed by José Luis Garci
 You're the One (1941 film), a 1941 musical film
 You're the One (TV series), a 1998 American sitcom

Music

Albums
 You're the One (album), by Paul Simon, and the title song, 2000
 You're the One, by Lory Bianco, 1993

Songs
 "You Are the One" (a-ha song), 1988
 "You're the One" (The Black Keys song), 2007
 "You're the One" (Bonnie Tyler song), 1995
 "You're the One" (Charli XCX song), 2012
 "You're the One" (Dondria song), 2009
 "You're the One" (Dwight Yoakam song), 1990
 "You're the One" (Greta Van Fleet song), 2018
 "You're the One" (Glen Campbell song), 1977
 "You're the One" (Petula Clark song), notably covered by The Vogues, 1965
 "You Are the One" (Safia song), 2014
 "You're the One" (Sandeé song), 1987
 "You're the One" (Shane MacGowan & Máire Brennan song), 1995
 "You Are the One" (Shiny Toy Guns song), 2007
 "You're the One" (SWV song), 1996
 "You Are the One" (TKA song), 1989
 "You're the One" (Yoko Ono song), 1984
 "You Are the One" by C21
 "You Are the One", by Camel from The Single Factor
 "You're the One", by The Carpenters from Lovelines
 "You're the One", by Clannad from Anam
 "You Are the One", by Con Funk Shun from To the Max
 "You Are the One", by Elliott Yamin from the self-titled album
 "You're the One", by Guerilla Black from Guerilla City
 "You Are the One", by HIM from Deep Shadows and Brilliant Highlights
 "You're the One", by Julian Lennon from Mr. Jordan
 "You're the One", by Kana Nishino from To Love
 "You're the One", by Kate Bush from The Red Shoes
 "You're the One", by Magnum from Sleepwalking
 "You're the One", by The Marvelettes from Sophisticated Soul
 "You Are the One", by Mike + The Mechanics from the self-titled album
 "You're the One", by The New Seekers from Together
 "You Are the One", by Pet Shop Boys from Hotspot
 "You're the One", by Roy Orbison from King of Hearts
 "You Are the One", by Sentenced from The Cold White Light
 "You're the One", by Sugarcult from Start Static
 "You Are the One", by Take That from Everything Changes
 "You Are the One", by Toni Gonzaga, featuring Sam Milby, from You Are the One
 "You're the One", by Tracy Chapman from Let It Rain
 "You're the One", composed by Vincent Youmans, with lyrics by J. Russel Robinson and George Waggner
 "You're the One (For Me)", by Frank Sinatra
 "You're the One", by Elaine from Elements
 "You're the One", by Luther Allison from Hand Me Down My Moonshine

See also 
 Are You the One? (disambiguation)
 "You're Still the One", by Shania Twain